A hand net, also called a scoop net, is a fishing net or meshed basket held open on a rigid hoop, which may or may not be mounted to the end of a handle. A hand net with a long handle is often called a dip net.  When it is used by an angler to help fetch out ("land") a hooked fish, it is called a landing net.

Hand nets have been used since antiquity for catching fish near the surface of the water, especially feisty, powerful ones such as muskellunge or northern pike. Because hand-netting is not physically destructive to the fish, hand nets are often used for tag and release, or to retrieve aquarium fish. There are popular contemporary dip net sockeye salmon fisheries in Chitina, Kenai River and Kasilof River, typically lasting two to three weeks, and is regarded as a subsistence fishery for Alaskan residents only. Dip nets can also be used to scoop crabs in shallow water. The basket is made of wire or nylon mesh, rather than cloth mesh, since crabs fight, bite, twist and turn when they are caught.

History
Hand nets have been widely used by traditional fishermen. Small fish are caught both in the shallow water of lagoons and in the open sea. They are made in different sizes ranging from small nets held in one hand to large scoop nets worked by several men. Historically, the Karuk people of the upper Klamath River harvested fish with dip nets.

In England, hand netting is the only legal way of catching eels and has been practised for thousands of years on the River Parrett and River Severn.

Gallery

See also
 Lift net
 Cast net
 Butterfly net

Notes

External links

 Long handled dip net
 Dipnetting on the Copper River YouTube.

Fishing techniques and methods
Fishing nets